The Presidio River is a river of Mexico. It originates in the mountains of Durango, flowing south-southwesterly into Sinaloa before joining the Pacific Ocean southeast of Mazatlán. The watershed measures .

See also
List of rivers of Mexico

References

Atlas of Mexico, 1975 (https://www.webcitation.org/689BebJNR?url=http://www.lib.utexas.edu/maps/atlas_mexico/river_basins.jpg).
The Prentice Hall American World Atlas, 1984.
Rand McNally, The New International Atlas, 1993.

Rivers of Mexico